SES/RTS, part of the WIN Television network, are Australian television stations licensed to, and serving the rural south-east portion of South Australia, including Mount Gambier, the Limestone Coast and the Riverland. The network began as two separate stations, SES-8 and RTS-5A.

History
It was originally two individual stations serving different regions. SES-8 commenced transmissions on 25 March 1966 serving Mount Gambier and south-east South Australia. RTS-5A began on 26 November 1976 serving Loxton, Renmark and the Riverland.

In the 1990s, RTS was bought by SES, but it continued to produce a local news bulletin, and identified on-air as 5A.

In 1999, WIN Television acquired SES and RTS and integrated them into the WIN Television network, with the branding now matching that of the Nine Network. In December 2003, 24-hour transmission commenced.

Prior to 2004, SES/RTS were the only commercial television stations broadcasting in Mount Gambier and the south east of South Australia, respectively. The stations broadcast a mixture of programs derived from the Seven Network, Nine Network and Network Ten. However, in 2004, WIN Television introduced a sole Network Ten affiliate, WIN Ten (MGS/LRS), becoming the second commercial television station in the region.  Following this, SES/RTS became sole Nine Network affiliates, only sport programs (particularly AFL matches) being acquired from the Seven Network.

SES and RTS, along with GTS/BKN, switched off its analogue signal on 15 December 2010 at 9am. SES and RTS plan on started providing the multichannels GO!, GEM, 7TWO, 7mate, One and Eleven, expanding to the south east area from 11 November 2011, with other areas completed by early 2012.

On 1 July 2016, WIN Seven and WIN Nine aligned with Seven Network and Nine Network, after their program supply agreement through its affiliation with Network Ten to WIN TEN.

On July 1 2021, the channels Seven SA, Nine SA and WIN SA were rebranded as Seven SA, Nine SA and 10 SA went aligned with Seven Network, Nine Network and Network 10, after their program supply agreement through its affiliation with Nine Network to Nine SA.

Channel Nine
WIN in South Australia, like its services in other states, was primarily an affiliate of the Nine Network. However, in September 2007, WIN Television announced plans to convert the station into a sole Seven Network affiliate, due to a disagreement with the Nine Network's owner, PBL Media, over affiliation advertising revenue. As a result of the switch, alongside the local news updates, WIN SA began broadcasting Seven News and Today Tonight from SAS in Adelaide rather than Nine's, as well as Seven's national newscasts and Sunrise.

On 7 August 2009, WIN recommenced broadcasting Channel Nine as a digital only service (callsign SDS in Spencer Gulf and RDS in the Riverland), would be starting on 4 October 2009. The channel is a direct feed of NWS-9 Adelaide, but with local commercials.

After SES's and RTS's analogue signal was switched off, the three services were rebranded as Seven SA, WIN and Ten SA. On 1 July 2016, they rebranded as Seven SA, Nine SA, and WIN respectively, to represent a change in affiliation within the WIN Network. On 1 July 2021, they rebranded as Seven SA, Nine SA, and 10 SA respectively, to represent a change in affiliation within the WIN Network.

Programming
Seven SA broadcasts programs from the Seven Network, including the Adelaide edition of Seven News while Nine SA broadcasts programs from the Nine Network, including the Adelaide edition of Nine News and A Current Affair. The station also carries the Adelaide feeds of 7two, 7mate, 9Go!, 9Gem and 9Life.

News output
Up until October 2010, two separate bulletins were produced for the Mount Gambier and Riverland areas.

Then until February 2013, WIN News produced and broadcast a regional news bulletin for the combined SES/RTS region each weekday evening. Reporters and camera crews were based within the area at newsrooms in Mount Gambier and Loxton with the bulletin latterly broadcast from NWS-9's studios in Adelaide.

The last regional program was broadcast on Friday 15 February 2013 with the news service ceasing operations after the weekend, and ten staff at the Mount Gambier and Loxton newsrooms made redundant.

In 2014, WIN introduced short local news updates for the two areas, produced in co-operation with The Border Watch and The Murray Pioneer. The updates, presented by Britt Ditterich, air on all three WIN services during the 6pm timeslot (during Seven News for Seven SA, 10 News First and The Project for 10 SA and Nine News for Nine SA). All 3 WIN channels also carry the SA and national editions of news programs of their respective partner networks, plus state and national updates from the latter as well as The Project (10 SA only).

See also

 WIN Television
 Seven Network
 Nine Network

References

External links
 WIN Television
 ausTVhistory | WIN SA

WIN Television